Donn Charnley (April 3, 1928-February 5, 2023) was an American politician in the state of Washington. Charnley served in the Washington House of Representatives and Washington State Senate as a Democrat from the 1st and 44th Districts from 1971 until 1985. In his second stint in the House 1983–1985, Charnley served as the Majority Whip.

Early life and career
Charnely was born in Detroit to journalism professor Mitchell Charnley and writer Margery “Peg” Lindsay. He graduated from Broadway High School in Seattle in 1945. Charnley graduated with a bachelor's and masters degree in Geology from the University of Washington, and later a mater's degree in Educational Psychology from the University of Minnesota in 1965. 

In 1964, Charnley started teaching at Shoreline Community College, retiring in 1996.

Political career
Charnley ran for and was elected to the Washington House of Representatives in 1970 in the 44th Legislative District. He served in this position until 1981. 

In 1980, Charnley was elected to the Washingotn State Senate, serving until 1983. In 1982, Charnley was reelected to the State House in the 1st LD. In 1984, Charnley unsuccessfully ran for the State Senate in the 1st LD against Bill Kiskaddon by a 52 percent to 48 percent margin.

References

http://www.sos.wa.gov/elections/results_report.aspx?e=&c=Charnley&c2=&t=&t2=&p=&p2=&y= 
http://leg.wa.gov/History/Legislative/Documents/Pictorial_Phone/1983TelephoneDirectory.pdf

1928 births
Politicians from Detroit
Democratic Party Washington (state) state senators
Democratic Party members of the Washington House of Representatives
University of Washington alumni
University of Minnesota alumni